Senator Burns may refer to:

Barnabas Burns (1817–1883), Ohio State Senate
Bob Burns (Arizona politician) (born 1938), Arizona State Senate
Brenda Burns (born 1950), Arizona State Senate
Bruce Burns (born 1952), Wyoming State Senate
Charles H. Burns (1835–1909), New Hampshire State Senate
Conrad Burns (1935–2016), U.S. Senator from Montana
David Burns, Lord Burns (born 1952), Senator of the College of Justice of Scotland
David C. Burns (fl. 2000s–2010s), Maine State Senate
Edward E. Burns (1858–1941), Wisconsin State Senate
Harold Burns (1926–2013), New Hampshire State Senate
J. Frederick Burns (fl. 1930s–1940s), Maine State Senate
J. Irving Burns (1843–1925), New York State Senate
John David Burns (born 1936), Oregon State Senate
Michael Burns (Tennessee politician) (1813–1896), Tennessee State Senate
Otway Burns (1775–1850), North Carolina State Senate
Patrick Burns (businessman) (1856–1937), State Senate of Canada
Robert Burns (Oklahoma politician) (1874–1950), Oklahoma State Senate
Robert Burns (representative) (1792–1866), New Hampshire State Senate

See also
Harry T. Burn (1895–1977), Tennessee State Senate
Senator Byrnes (disambiguation)